MS Galaxy is a cruise ferry built in 2006 by Aker Finnyards, Rauma, Finland and was at the time the largest ship delivered to ferry operator Tallink. Between 2006–2008 she held the distinction of being the largest ship ever to be registered in Estonia; a title later held by her replacement the sister ship .

Between July 2008 and September 2022, Galaxy sailed on the Stockholm–Åland–Turku route under Tallink's Silja Line brand. After ending this service, the Galaxy is scheduled to be used as refugee housing in the Netherlands for at least seven months.

History

The introduction of Tallink's first newbuilding, the cruiseferry Romantika, in 2002 on the cruise service between Tallinn and Helsinki was a success. One year after her entry into this service, Tallink's fiercest competitor Viking Line, announced that they would withdraw their flagship Cinderella from the same route, replacing her with the more freight-oriented Rosella.

This led Tallink to order a bigger ship to replace the Romantika on 28 October 2004. Romantika, in turn, was needed to join her newly delivered sister ship, the Victoria I, on the Tallinn–Stockholm route.

Design & construction
Building of the new ship commenced in early 2005 and her keel was laid on 21 April. The shipyard was Aker Finnyards, Rauma.  The Rauma shipyard had previously built the Romantika and the Victoria I. On 1 December 2005, the new ship was launched and christened as Galaxy.

Designed as a carefully enlarged replica of the Romantika, the Galaxy is longer and has additional cabins and public areas. Leaving behind the external livery scheme introduced on the Romantika and her sister, the Galaxy sports a white hull with a cloud decorated blue superstructure, along with a number of different animals painted on her sides. The design of the livery was made by the Estonian artist Navitrolla.

Helsinki–Tallinn service

After performing her trials, the Galaxy entered service on the Tallinn–Helsinki route on 2 May 2006. The ship performed one round trip daily between the two capitals but spent most of her time moored in port—on her original route Galaxy was at sea for less than seven hours per day. In April 2007, less than a year after her introduction, Tallink announced that the Galaxy was to be transferred to the Stockholm–Mariehamn/Långnäs–Turku route  during 2008. She was replaced by her sister ship Baltic Princess.

Stockholm–Turku service

Following the Baltic Princess replacing Galaxy on the Tallinn–Helsinki route, Galaxy replaced Silja Festival on the Stockholm–Turku route on 23 July 2008. Coinciding with the route change, Galaxy was re-registered to Sweden. The ships external livery, as well as her name, was left unchanged, despite an earlier statement made by Tallink that she would be re-painted in Silja livery. A "Silja Line" hull text did replace the "Tallink Cruise" text on her sides, but her Tallink funnel logo was left unaltered.  Before beginning service, Galaxy was docked at Naantali for three days.

Refugee Housing Charter
Starting in September 2022, the Galaxy is being used as refugee housing in The Netherlands until at least March 2023.

Decks
Galaxy has ten decks.

See also
Largest ferries of Europe

References

External links

  Tallink Silja official website for M/S Galaxy
  M/S Galaxy at Fakta om Fartyg

Ferries of Estonia
Ferries of Sweden
Ships built in Rauma, Finland
Cruiseferries
2005 ships